Ioannis Diakidis, 1867–1962) was a Greek writer. He was born on the island of Symi in the Dodecanese at the time was part of the Ottoman Empire.  He was a soccer player at the Panachaikos with many wins in games.  He constructed a mountainous refuge in the Panachaiko mountains, he gave to the government a residence at Korinthou Street and he donated the funds to build the School of People where it was named Diakideios to honor him. He was the brother of Themistoklis Diakidis, olympic medal winner.

References

 ''The first version of the article is translated and is based from the article at the Greek Wikipedia

1867 births
1962 deaths
Writers from Patras
People from Symi
Greeks from the Ottoman Empire